A.P.D. Sangimignano is an Italian association football club located in San Gimignano, Tuscany. The club currently plays in Serie D. Their colours are black and green.

References

Football clubs in Tuscany